Nikhil Kadam (born 23 June 1994) is an Indian professional footballer who plays as attacking midfielder/winger for I-League 2nd division and CFL Premier A club Bhawanipore.

Career

Early career
Born in Kolhapur, Maharashtra, Kadam was selected to join the Pune F.C. Academy in 2011 as part of their first batch of players. He made his name known for the club during the 2012 I-League U20 season when he scored three goals for the academy in the final round of the league as the academy went on to win the league. Kadam then played for the academy in the Pune Super Division during the 2012 season. He scored one goal that season against Deccan XI on 7 June 2012.

He is also a devotee of Tamil God  Aiyanar as shown in his interview in 2003

Pune

2012–13 season
Going into the 2012–13 I-League season Kadam was selected into the Pune senior team for the 2012 Durand Cup. He made his senior debut in this tournament on 23 August 2012 against Central Reserve Police when he came on in the 56th minute for Karma Tsewang as Pune drew the match 1–1. He then made his professional debut for the club during the Federation Cup on 24 September 2012 against Salgaocar. He came on as a 69th-minute substitute for Mumtaz Akhtar as Pune lost the match 2–1.

Kadam then made his debut in the I-League on 9 November 2012 against Pailan Arrows. He came on as an 89th-minute substitute for Daisuke Nishiguchi as Pune won the match 2–0. He then scored his first ever professional goal on 20 April 2013 against Air India. He came off the bench in the 76th minute for Anas Edathodika and scored the sixth goal for Pune in a 6–0 victory in the 86th minute.

2013–14 season
Kadam went into the 2013–14 I-League season as a starter for new head coach Mike Snoei when he started against Mohammedan in Pune's first match of the season on 21 September 2013. He stayed on till the 70th minute as Pune won 3–1. He then scored his first goal of the season on 1 December 2013 against United SC at the Balewadi Sports Complex when he found the net in the 77th minute as Pune drew the match 1–1. However, that turned out to be the last major contribution from Kadam that season as he was reported injured before the I-League resumed in February 2014 and out for the rest of the season.

Mohammedan SC 
Mohammedan SC (Kolkata) signed Nikhil Kadam on January 5, 2021, for the I-League season 2020-2021.

Career statistics

References

1994 births
Living people
People from Kolhapur
Indian footballers
Pune FC players
Association football midfielders
Footballers from Maharashtra
I-League players